The Deschutes Historical Museum is a museum of local history that is located in the historic Reid School in Bend, Oregon.  Opened in 1980 and operated by the Deschutes County Historical Society, the museum's exhibits focus on the area's prehistory, Native American tribes, explorers, pioneers, the logging industry, transportation, and the United States Forest Service.  Historic items and antiques are displayed to show home and school life in different periods.

The history library is open to the public and a small bookstore features works on Central Oregon history.

The museum is closed on Sundays and Mondays.

References

External links
Deschutes Historical Museum - official site

History museums in Oregon
Historical society museums in Oregon
Museums in Deschutes County, Oregon
Buildings and structures in Bend, Oregon
Culture of Bend, Oregon
Tourist attractions in Bend, Oregon
1980 establishments in Oregon
Museums established in 1980